The 1973 Sandown Park Cup was the seventh round of the 1973 Tasman Series. It was a Formula 5000 race held at Sandown International Raceway. It was held on 18 February on the same circuit that would in November be used for the 1973 Australian Grand Prix. New Zealander Graham McRae won the race and went on to win the Grand Prix as well.

The race was promoted by the Light Car Club of Australia as the Chesterfield 100.

Classification

Notes 
Pole position: Graham McRae, McRae GM1 Chevrolet, 1'01.3
Fastest lap: Frank Matich, Matich A50 Repco Holden, 1'02.6s

References

Sandown Park Cup
Motorsport at Sandown
Tasman Series
Formula 5000 race reports